Ovabaşı is a village in Anamur district of Mersin Province, Turkey. It is situated in the southern slopes of Toros Mountains to the north of Anamur. The population of Ovabaşı was 394  as of 2011. It is surrounded by orange groves. The orange produced in the village is known as "Ovabaşı orange".

Köşekbükü asthma cave
There is a cave to the south of the village known as "Köşekbükü cave". It is believed that respiration in the cave cures asthma. According to legend a certain Anna, allegedly a daughter of a Roman Emperor had been cured in the cave.

References

Villages in Anamur District